Quilchena is an unincorporated community located on the south shore of Nicola Lake near the city of Merritt, British Columbia, Canada in that province's Nicola Country region.  On the former main route between Merritt and Kamloops, it is now largely bypassed since the construction of the Coquihalla Highway.  A heritage hotel is the main landmark, lately transformed into a small golf resort.

References

BCGNIS listing "Quilchena (locality)"
Quilchena Hotel website

Unincorporated settlements in British Columbia
Nicola Country
Populated places in the Thompson-Nicola Regional District